Madeleine Ruby Ratcliffe (born 17 October 1997) is a field hockey player from Australia, who plays as a forward.

Personal life
Ratcliffe was born and raised in Warrnambool, Victoria.

She was a scholarship holder at the Victorian Institute of Sport (VIS), and currently studies a Bachelor of Commerce at Deakin University.

Career

National teams

Under–21
In 2016, Ratcliffe made her debut for the Jillaroos during the Junior Oceania Cup on the Gold Coast. The team won gold, qualifying for the FIH Junior World Cup in Santiago later that year. Ratcliffe was also highest scorer at the tournament, with four goals.

Hockeyroos
Ratcliffe made her debut for the Hockeyroos in 2016 during a test series against Great Britain in Bunbury and Perth.

During her career, Ratcliffe medalled twice with the Hockeyroos. She won gold at the 2017 Oceania Cup in Sydney, and silver at the 2018 Commonwealth Games on the Gold Coast.

International goals

References

External links
 
 
 

1997 births
Living people
Australian female field hockey players
People from Warrnambool
Commonwealth Games medallists in field hockey
Commonwealth Games silver medallists for Australia
Field hockey players at the 2018 Commonwealth Games
Medallists at the 2018 Commonwealth Games